Moss Icon is an American post-hardcore band formed in late 1986 in Annapolis, Maryland, United States. Its original lineup comprised vocalist Jonathan Vance, guitarist Tonie Joy, bassist Monica DiGialleonardo, and drummer Mark Laurence. Alex Badertscher joined as second guitarist in 1990. Moss Icon is considered to be an early influence on the hardcore punk splinter genre known as post-hardcore, as well as on the eventual development of emo, although the band members themselves have repeatedly denied knowingly contributing to the latter genre in any way.

History and background

Formation to breakup
The band's identifying characteristics, and those that distinguished them from their contemporaries, included noticeable and abrupt transitions from loud to quiet, and Vance's esoteric, stream of conscious lyrical content. Earlier recordings of the band are reminiscent of early Joy Division, while later songs embodied a less blunt approach with more exploratory arrangements and riffage. Vance's lyrics touched upon vaguely, among other issues, the plight of indigenous peoples of the Americas, and opposed the U.S. government's involvement in Nicaragua and Guatemala.

The band played frequently with fellow Annapolis band The Hated.  Moss Icon recorded their debut 7", "Hate in Me", in January 1988, and entered the studio several months later to record their second 7", "Mahpiua Luta". Their Lyburnum Wits End Liberation Fly LP was recorded by Les Lentz (who engineered all of their studio recordings) throughout 1988 but was not released until mid-1994, three years after the band's break-up, by Vermiform Records. Moss Icon's third 7", entitled "Memorial", was recorded in January 1991 along with a split LP with Silver Bearing. In 1994 Ebullition Records released the It Disappears LP, compiling songs from "Memorial" with live versions of several songs.

In 1990 a splinter project of Moss Icon was formed called Breathing Walker, containing all four members of Moss Icon plus Alex Badertscher on bass, Zak Fusciello on percussion, and Tim Horner on violin. Breathing Walker released a cassette that was re-released on vinyl and CD in 2001 by the Vermin Scum label, along with live tracks.

Post-breakup and 2001 reformation
After the dissolution of Moss Icon, guitarist Tonie Joy was a member of the bands Universal Order of Armageddon, Born Against, and The Convocation Of.... (later rechristened The Convocation). Other band members were less involved in music, excepting Laurence's drums in Lava, DiGialleonardo's Blue Condors, and Vance's solo debut LP.

Moss Icon reunited to play two shows with Zak Fusciello on drums, one at the 2001 More Than Music Fest in Columbus, Ohio and the other at the renovated Charles Theatre in Baltimore, Maryland.

Recent activity
In July 2008, Moss Icon was named one of the "23 Bands Who Shaped Punk" by Alternative Press magazine in issue No. 240.  Vance's first officially released book Tulip Has a Room was published by Easysubcult.

Since 2007 Joy, Vance, Zak Fusciello, and Alex Badertscher have been occasionally working on new material in Baltimore, MD for a possible new recording.  A discography was released in May 2012 on Temporary Residence Limited which featured two discs, photos and lyrics. The band also played a couple live shows (NYC and Washington DC) in December 2014.

Discography
Demo Tape cassette (1987, self-released)
Hate in Me
What They Lack
Never Turning
My Strength, My Weakness
Mirror
We Deny
Sorrow

Hate in Me 7" (1988, Vermin Scum/Dancing Song)
Hate In Me
What They Lack
I'm Back Sleeping or Fucking or Something
Kiss The Girls and Make Them Die

Mahpiua Luta 7" (1989, Vermin Scum)
The Life or This Grape’s Juice Drink
Kicks the Can

Memorial 7" (1991, Vermin Scum)
Memorial
Moth

Moss Icon/Silver Bearing split LP with Silver Bearing (1991, Vermin Scum)
Guatemala
Gravity
Familiar Presides
As Afterwards The Words Still Ring

Lyburnum Wits End Liberation Fly LP (1994, Vermiform Records)
reissued in 1997 on CD with selected tracks from It Disappears as Lyburnum on Vermiform Records
Mirror
I'm Back Sleeping or Fucking or Something
The Life
Divinity Cove
Locket
Kick the Can
Lyburnum Wits End Liberation Fly
Cricketty Rise
As Afterwards The Words Still Ring
Happy (Unbounded Glory)

It Disappears LP (1994, Ebullition Records/ Vermin Scum)
Guatemala
Memorial
Moth
Gravity
I'm Back Sleeping or Fucking or Something (Live)
It Disappears

Compilation appearances
Panx Zine No. 3 compilation 7" - song "Mirror" (1988, Panx)
Life is Change comp CD - song "Guatemala" (1991, Bari Beri)
Superpowers cassette compilation - song "Sioux Day" (1992, Troubleman Unlimited)
Powerless II comp LP - song "Divinity Cove" (1992)
Fear of Smell comp LP - song "Excerpt From It Disappears" (1993, Vermiform)
False Object Sensor comp LP/CD - song "Cornflower Blue" with Daniel Littleton of The Hated and Ida, and Michael Littleton of Ida (2001, Vermiform—also appears on The Hated "unreleased songs" bootleg LP)

References

External links
Temporary Residence reissues website
Moss Icon - BandToBand.com
Review of the Hate In Me 7"
Moss Icon's Official Myspace page
Alternative Press July, 2008, Issue No. 240

American post-hardcore musical groups
Hardcore punk groups from Maryland
Musical groups established in 1986
1986 establishments in Maryland
American emo musical groups
First-wave emo bands